Ida de Tosny, Countess of Norfolk (died after 1181), was a Norman royal mistress. Named after her grandmother Ida de Hainaut, she was the daughter of Ralph IV de Tosny (died 1162) and his wife Margaret (born  1125 and living in 1185), a daughter of Robert de Beaumont, 2nd Earl of Leicester.

Relationship to King Henry II
Ida de Tosny was a royal ward and mistress of Henry II, King of England, by whom she was mother of one of his illegitimate sons, William Longespée, 3rd Earl of Salisbury, (c. 1176 – 7 March 1226), as demonstrated by the discovery of a charter of William mentioning "Comitissa Ida, mater mea" (Countess Ida, my mother). Ida was not the first English royal ward to be taken as a royal mistress. Isabel de Beaumont (Elizabeth de Beaumont), was the ward of King Henry I and the mistress of one of his sons.

Marriage
Around Christmas 1181, Ida de Tosny was given by Henry II in marriage to Roger Bigod, 2nd Earl of Norfolk, together with the manors of Acle, Halvergate and South Walsham, which had been confiscated from Roger's inheritance after the death of his father Hugh Bigod, 1st Earl of Norfolk. Ida and Roger had a number of children, including:
 Hugh Bigod, 3rd Earl of Norfolk, who in 1206 or 1207 married Maud Marshal, a daughter of William Marshal
 William Bigod
 Roger Bigod
 John Bigod
 Ralph Bigod
 Mary Bigod, who married Ralph fitz Robert
 Margery Bigod, who married William de Hastings
 Ida Bigod

Many historians have speculated that the couple had a third daughter, Alice, who married Aubrey de Vere IV, 2nd Earl of Oxford, as his second wife.

Ida de Tosney in fiction
Ida de Tosny and her husband Roger are the main characters in Elizabeth Chadwick's The Time of Singing (Sphere, 2008), published in the US as For the King's Favor. They appear as minor characters in other of her books set at the same time, notably To Defy a King, which concerns the marriage of their son Hugh to Maud, a daughter of William Marshal.

References

Anglo-Norman women
Ida
Mistresses of Henry II of England
Year of birth unknown
12th-century English women
12th-century English people
Norfolk